Down the Highway is a compilation album by American singer-songwriter Jim Croce, released in 1980 on Lifesong Records as LS 8030.

Track listing
All tracks composed by Jim Croce; except where indicated

"I Got a Name" (Charles Fox, Norman Gimbel) – 3:12
"Mississippi Lady" – 3:59
"New York's Not My Home" – 3:08
"Chain Gang Medley: Chain Gang/He Don't Love You/Searchin'" (Sam Cooke; Jerry Butler, Calvin Carter, Curtis Mayfield; Jerry Leiber, Mike Stoller) – 4:32
"You Don't Mess Around with Jim" – 3:03
"Ol' Man River" (Oscar Hammerstein, Jerome Kern) – 2:27
"Which Way Are You Goin'?" – 2:19
"Bad, Bad Leroy Brown" – 3:01
"Walkin' Back to Georgia" – 2:50
"Box #10" – 2:26
"Speedball Tucker" – 2:26
"Alabama Rain" – 2:12

Production
Producer: Terry Cashman, Tommy West

Charts
Singles

Jim Croce albums
Compilation albums published posthumously
1975 compilation albums
Saja Records compilation albums